Kino's Journey is a Japanese light novel series written by Keiichi Sigsawa, and illustrated by Kohaku Kuroboshi. The series premiered in the sixth volume of Dengeki hp on March 17, 2000. The first volume of the series was published on July 10, 2000 under ASCII Media Works' Dengeki Bunko publishing imprint. As of October 2017, around 8.2 million copies of the novels had been sold in Japan. 23 volumes have been published as of November 2020.

Tokyopop licensed the novels for an English language release in North America. The first volume was published on October 3, 2006. Tokyopop released the series under its rōmaji title of Kino no Tabi and rearranged the chapters of the first volume. Due to issues with the licensor, the remaining volumes have been canceled. The light novel series has also been translated into Chinese, Korean, and German. An additional volume entitled  was released as a promotional gift for the second animated movie.

A spin-off of the regular series under the title Gakuen Kino was also created. The first volume of the spin-off series was released on July 10, 2006 under Dengeki Bunko; the fifth volume was released on July 8, 2011. Volume six was released in October 2019 and seven in May 2021. The series is a collection of parodies originally published in three spin-off magazines of Dengeki hp: Dengeki p, Dengeki h, and Dengeki hpa. The spin-off features Kino as a magical girl in a school setting.

Light novels

Kino's Journey

Gakuen Kino

See also
List of Kino's Journey episodes

References

External links

Official website of the light novels 
 at ASCII Media Works 

Kino's Journey